The Stuart Sapphire is a blue sapphire that forms part of the British Crown Jewels. It weighs 104 carats (20.8 grams) and is believed to have originated from Asia, potentially present-day Afghanistan, Sri Lanka, Myanmar or Kashmir.

Beginning 
The early history of the gem is quite obscure, though it probably belonged to Charles II, and was definitely among the jewels that his successor James VII and II took with him when he fled to France after the Glorious Revolution in December 1688.

From there it passed to his son, James Stuart (the 'Old Pretender') who bequeathed it to his son, Henry Benedict, known later as Cardinal York, who wore it in his mitre.

As the last descendant of James VII and II, the cardinal put the sapphire, along with many other Stuart relics, up for sale. It was purchased by George III in 1807 and returned to the United Kingdom from Italy.

On the Imperial State Crown of Queen Victoria, the jewel took pride of place at the front of the circlet, just below the Black Prince's Ruby.

In 1909, during the reign of Edward VII, it was moved to the back of the crown to make way for the  Cullinan II diamond; it still occupies that position in the back of the Imperial State Crown made in 1937 (a copy of Victoria's) and used by Elizabeth II.

The Stuart Sapphire is on public display with the other Crown Jewels in the Jewel House at the Tower of London.

Description
The sapphire weighs . At some point a hole was drilled at one end, probably to introduce an attachment by which the stone could be worn as a pendant.

On the back is a miniature plaque engraved with a short history of the Imperial State Crown.

See also
 List of individual gemstones
 List of sapphires by size

References 

Individual sapphires
Crown Jewels of the United Kingdom